The First Teacher is a 1965 drama film directed by Andrei Konchalovsky. It is his first full-length work, based on the book by Chinghiz Aitmatov.

Synopsis 
The action takes place in the years from 1924 all the way to the early 1950s in the Kurkureu village of the Kirghiz Soviet Socialist Republic, which is now Kyrgyzstan.

The Russian Civil War ended not so long ago. Young Komsomol member and a former Red Army soldier, Dyuyshen, travels to a remote village where he takes up his post as the new teacher for the children of the village. His enthusiasm to bring new ideas immediately faces a centuries-old tradition of life in Central Asia. The former soldier tries to improve the children's literacy but faces opposition from their Muslim parents who, moreover, look unfavorably on the idea of a girl joining the school. Dyuyshen meets Altynai, a 15-year-old illiterate girl who has a burning desire to study, but her aunt sells her to a powerful and wealthy chieftain. The school is burned down. The film ends with the promise of it being rebuilt using a centuries-old tree which had been a source of pride to the villagers.

Cast 
 Bolot Beyshenaliyev as The school teacher Dyuyshen
 Natalya Arinbasarova as Altynay
 Idris Nogajbayev as Narmagambet
 Darkul Kuyukova as Koltynay 
 Kirey Zharkimbayev as Kartynbay
 Baken Kydykeeva as Chernukha
  Sovetbek Dzhumadylov  as Kaimbay

Prizes and awards
 Silver medal and Volpi Cup for Best Actress to Venice Film Festival (1966) - Natalia Arinbasarova
 Jussi Award for Best Foreign Director, Finland, 1973

References

External links
  
 

1965 films
Mosfilm films
Soviet black-and-white films
Films directed by Andrei Konchalovsky
Soviet drama films
1965 directorial debut films
1965 drama films